Bagnatica is a comune (municipality) in the Province of Bergamo in the Italian region of Lombardy, located about  northeast of Milan and about  southeast of Bergamo.

References

External links
 Official website